Nhandu is a genus of South American tarantulas that was first described by S. Lucas in 1983. Brazilopelma was synonymized with it in 2001.

Diagnosis 
They can be distinguished by the lack of stridulating organs, extension of the scopula on the metatarsus. They can also further be distinguished by the lack of spurs on the males and the palpal bulb with short embolus. Females also own a distinct spermatheca morphology.

Species
 it contains five species, found in Paraguay and Brazil:
Nhandu carapoensis Lucas, 1983 (type) – Brazil, Paraguay
Nhandu cerradensis Bertani, 2001 – Brazil
Nhandu chromatus Schmidt, 2004 – Brazil
Nhandu coloratovillosus (Schmidt, 1998) – Brazil
Nhandu tripepii (Dresco, 1984) – Brazil

In synonymy 
 Nhandu tripartitus Schmidt, 1997 = Nhandu carapoensis
 Nhandu vulpinus (Schmidt, 1998) = Nhandu tripepii

See also
 List of Theraphosidae species

References

Theraphosidae genera
Spiders of South America
Theraphosidae